The 1995 Barcelona Dragons season was the third season for the franchise in the World League of American Football (WLAF). The team was led by head coach Jack Bicknell in his third year, and played its home games at Estadi Olímpic de Montjuïc in Barcelona, Catalonia, Spain. They finished the regular season in third place with a record of five wins and five losses.

Offseason

World League draft

NFL allocations

Personnel

Staff

Roster

Schedule

Standings

Game summaries

Week 1: at Amsterdam Admirals

Week 6: vs Amsterdam Admirals

Notes

References

Barcelona Dragons seasons